The Japan women's national under-23 football team（Japanese: U-23サッカー日本女子代表）is a national association football youth team of Japan and is controlled by the Japan Football Association.

Results and fixtures

Legend

2013

2014

2015

2016

2017

 Fixtures and results (Japan Under 23) – Soccerway.com

Coaching staff

Current coaching staff

Manager history

Competitive record

La Manga International Women's U-23 Tournament

AFF Women's Championship

See also 
 Sports in Japan
 Football in Japan
 Women's football in Japan
 Japan women's national football team
 Japan women's national under-20 football team
 Japan women's national under-17 football team
 Japan men's national football team

References

External links 
 Japan Football Association (JFA)

Asian women's national under-23 association football teams
Women's national under-23 association football teams
Football